Amalia Polleri de Viana (26 June 1909 – 18 June 1996) was a Uruguayan teacher, artist, poet, journalist, and art critic.

Biography
Amalia Polleri devoted herself to painting, sculpture, engraving, poetry, and storytelling. She was a teacher of drawing and defender of women's rights. She wrote for La República, El Diario, La Mañana, Brecha, and other print media. She also worked in radio journalism.

Polleri died on 18 June 1996, at the age of 86.

In 2013, an exhibition was held at the  that reviewed part of her work.

Awards
Polleri won 1st prize in drawing and engraving at the 1942 National Salon for her drawing El niño loco. In 1995 she received the Gold Candelabrum Award from the Jewish organization B'nai Brith in recognition of her career.

Works
 El niño loco (drawing, First Prize Drawing and Engraving, National Salon 1942)
 El lenguaje gráfico plástico: manual para docentes estudiantes y artistas, Amalia Polleri, María C. Rovira, and Brenda Lissardy

References

External links
 

1909 births
1996 deaths
Uruguayan art critics
20th-century journalists
20th-century Uruguayan painters
20th-century Uruguayan poets
20th-century Uruguayan women writers
20th-century women artists
Uruguayan educators
Uruguayan radio journalists
Uruguayan radio presenters
Uruguayan women educators
Uruguayan women journalists
Uruguayan women painters
Uruguayan women poets
Uruguayan women radio presenters
Uruguayan women radio journalists
Women art critics
Writers from Montevideo
Place of death missing